The 2019–20 Texas State Bobcats men's basketball team represented Texas State University in the 2019–20 NCAA Division I men's basketball season. The Bobcats, led by 7th-year head coach Danny Kaspar, played their home games at Strahan Arena in San Marcos, Texas as members of the Sun Belt Conference. They finished the season 21–11, 13–7 in Sun Belt play to finish in a tie for second place. They defeated Appalachian State in the quarterfinals of the Sun Belt tournament and were set to face South Alabama in the semifinals until the tournament was cancelled amid the COVID-19 pandemic.

On September 22, 2020, head coach Danny Kaspar resigned amid allegations of racially insensitive language used at players. He finished at Texas State with a seven-year record of 119–109.

Previous season
The Bobcats finished the 2018–19 season 24–10, 12–6 in Sun Belt play to finish in a three-way tie for 2nd place. In the Sun Belt tournament, they defeated South Alabama in the quarterfinals, before falling to Georgia State in the semifinals. They were invited to the CIT, where they were defeated by FIU in the first round.

Roster

Schedule and results

|-
!colspan=12 style=| Exhibition

|-
!colspan=12 style=| Non-conference regular season

|-
!colspan=9 style=| Sun Belt Conference regular season

|-
!colspan=12 style=| Sun Belt tournament

|- style="background:#bbbbbb"
| style="text-align:center"|March 14, 20202:00 pm, ESPN+
| style="text-align:center"| (3)
| vs. (2) South AlabamaSemifinals
| colspan=2 rowspan=1 style="text-align:center"|Cancelled due to the COVID-19 pandemic
| style="text-align:center"|Smoothie King CenterNew Orleans, LA
|-

Source

References

Texas State Bobcats men's basketball seasons
Texas State Bobcats
Texas State Bobcats men's basketball
Texas State Bobcats men's basketball